MV Pentalina is a 70m RoPax catamaran ferry purchased by Pentland Ferries in 2008 to operate between Gills Bay, Caithness and St Margaret's Hope, Orkney.

History
MV Pentalina was built in Cebu, Philippines, starting in February 2007. She was ready to launch in April 2008, although  there were delays in installing equipment. The 10,000 mile journey from the Philippines to Scotland was delayed by bad weather, forcing a short detour to Salalah, Oman. She arrived in St Margaret's Hope on 9 December 2008.

Layout
MV Pentalina was designed by the naval architects, Sea Transport Solutions of Australia. The catamaran form has a steel hull with aluminum superstructure. She is designed to handle the rough seas off the north coast of Scotland. Her overall length is 70m, beam 20m.

Route
MV Pentalina replaced ferry , crossing the Pentland Firth, between Gills Bay, Caithness and St Margaret's Hope, Orkney. She expects to make the  crossing in one hour.

References

Ferries of Scotland
2008 ships
Individual catamarans
Transport in Orkney